Astrolirus patricki is a species of starfish in the family Brisingidae.

This species was discovered to science in 2013, and described in 2020. All known specimens of the species were observed attached to hexactinellid sponges, indicating a close, possibly commensal, relationship between both taxa. Due to this apparent relationship with sponges, the species was named Astrolirus patricki as a reference to Patrick Star, an anthropomorphic starfish character from the animated series SpongeBob SquarePants, who is best friends with the titular character, an anthropomorphic sponge.

In 2021, the World Register of Marine Species selected A. patricki as one of "ten remarkable new species from 2020".

References 

Brisingida
Animals described in 2020
Fauna of the Pacific Ocean
SpongeBob SquarePants